William of Roskilde (died 1073 or 1074) was a Danish prelate of the Roman Catholic Church who served as the Bishop of Roskilde in Denmark from about 1060 to 1073 or 1074.

He was canonized as a saint on 21 January 1224 by Pope Honorius III.

His memorial is observed by the Roman Catholic Church on September 2.

See also

Roman Catholic Diocese of Roskilde

References

This article needs to be translated from the Danish wikipedia

Articles needing translation from Danish Wikipedia
Year of birth unknown
Date of birth unknown
12th-century Christian saints
12th-century Roman Catholic bishops in Denmark
Danish Roman Catholic saints
Medieval Danish saints